Joseph Patrick Kelly (born 1 March 1970) is an Australian politician. He attended Ignatius Park College in Townsville, North Queensland. He has been the Labor member for Greenslopes in the Queensland Legislative Assembly since 2015.

Joe Kelly is a registered nurse having completed his training at the Royal Brisbane Hospital.  He is also a member of the Australasian Rehabilitation Nurses' Association. Immediately prior to his election to the Queensland Parliament, Joe was employed as a clinical nurse at Queen Elizabeth II Jubilee Hospital, working in the area of rehabilitation.

He has attained the qualifications Certificate of Nursing (RN), Advanced Diploma of Business (ADipBus), Graduate Certificate of Health Economics (GradCertHealthEcon).

On 29 November 2016, Joe Kelly was elected as a member of the Parliamentary Crime and Corruption Committee, and on 14 February 2017 he was elected to Chair of the Queensland Parliament Agriculture and Environment Committee.  He has previous served as a member of the Health, Communities, Disability Services and Domestic Family Violence Prevention Committee, and Health and Ambulance Services Committee.

References

1970 births
Living people
Members of the Queensland Legislative Assembly
Australian Labor Party members of the Parliament of Queensland
21st-century Australian politicians
Labor Right politicians